The Diocese of Carcassonne and Narbonne (Latin: Dioecesis Carcassonensis et Narbonensis; French: Diocèse de Carcassonne et Narbonne) is a Latin Church ecclesiastical jurisdiction or diocese of the Catholic Church in France. The diocese comprises the entire department of Aude. It is suffragan to the Archdiocese of Montpellier.

On the occasion of the Concordat of 1802, the former Diocese of Carcassonne, nearly all the old Archdiocese of Narbonne, almost the entire Diocese of Saint-Papoul, a part of the ancient Diocese of Alet and ancient Diocese of Mirepoix, and the former Diocese of Perpignan, were united to make the one Diocese of Carcassonne. In 1822 the Diocese of Perpignan was re-established. In 2006 the diocese was renamed the Diocese of Carcassonne and Narbonne.

History
Carcassonne was founded by the Visigoths, who sought to compensate themselves for the loss of Lodève and Uzès by having Carcassonne made an episcopal see. The first of its bishops known to history was Sergius (589) and an Archdeacon of  Carcassonne, Donnel, is recorded as having subscribed to the acts of the 4th Council of Toledo in 633.

The churches of Nôtre-Dame de Canabès and Nôtre-Dame de Limoux, both of which date back to the ninth century, are still frequented by pilgrims. The Cathedral  of Saints-Nazaire-et-Celse at Carcassonne was rebuilt toward the end of the eleventh century, the first work upon it being blessed by Pope Urban II, who had come to Carcassonne in 1088 to urge the Viscount Bernard Ato IV de Trincavel to join the Crusade. In 1295 Pope Urban addressed a letter to Bishop Pierre, confirming the institution of Clercs Regular of Saint Augustine in the Chapter of the Cathedral.  The Chapter had existed for a considerable time, perhaps going back to Bishop Gimerius in the tenth century, but papal sanction confirmed and strengthened its position as a corporate body living under a Rule.  The approbation of Urban II was confirmed by Pope Anastasius IV in 1154.  The Chapter included as officers the two Archdeacons, two archpriests, a Sacristan, a Precentor, a Chamberlain, an Eleemosynary, and a master of the works.  In 1439, the canons were secularized by Pope Eugenius IV, and the Chapter came to have as officers a Dean, the Archdeacon, a Precentor, and a Sacristan.  There were thirty Canons, each with a prebend, and they received a new set of Statutes.

Since the Synod of 2007, the diocese has been reorganized into fourteen 'new parishes'.

The history of the region of Carcassonne is intimately connected with that of the Albigenses. Notre-Dame-de-Prouille Monastery, where St. Dominic established a religious institute for converted Albigensian women in 1206, is still a place of pilgrimage consecrated to the Blessed Virgin. St. Peter of Castelnau, the Cistercian inquisitor martyred by the Albigenses in 1208, St. Camelia, put to death by the same sectarians, and St. John Francis Regis (1597-1640), the Jesuit, born at Fontcouverte in the Diocese of Narbonne, are specially venerated in the present Diocese of Carcassonne.

From 1848 to 1855 the see was occupied by Bishop de Bonnechose, who was created a Cardinal by Pope Pius IX on 11 December 1863;  on 22 September 1864 he was given the red hat and named Cardinal-Priest of San Clemente. From 1855 to 1873, the see was held  by the mystical writer, François-Alexandre Roullet de La Bouillerie.

Bishops

To 1000

 Hilaire v.550
 Sergius 589
 Solemnius 633
 Elpidius 636
 Sylvestre 653
 Stephanus (Étienne, Stapin) 683
 Hispicio 791
 Señor 813
 Eurus 860
 Léger 878
 Willeran 883–897
 Saint Gimer 902–931
 Abbon 933–934
 Gisandus 934–952
 Franco 965–977
 Aimeric 982–986

1000 to 1300

 Adalbert 1002–1020
 Foulques 1028
 Guifred 1031–1058
 Bernard 1072–1075
 Pierre Artaud 1077–1083
 Pierre II 1083–1101
 Guillaume Bernard 1106–1107
 Raimond I 1107–1110
 Arnaud de Girone 1113–1130
 Raimond de Sorèze 1131–1141
 Pons de Tresmals 1142–1159
 Pons de Brugals 1159–1166
 Othon 1170–1201
 Bérenger 1201–1209
 Bernard-Raimond de Roquefort 1209–1231
 Guy de Vaux-de-Cernay 1212–1223 (contested)
 Clarín 1226–1248
 Guillaume Arnaud 1248–1255
 Guillaume Rudolphe 1256–1264
 Bernard de Capendu 1265–1278
 Gauthier (called Jean Gauthier, without warrant) 1278–1280
 Bérenger 1280
 Isarn v.1286
 Pierre de La Chapelle-Taillefer 1291–1298
 Jean de Chevry 1298–1300

1300 to 1500

 Pierre de Roquefort 1300–1321
 Guillaume de Flavacourt 1322–1323
 Pierre Rodier 1323–1330
 Pierre Jean 1330–1336
 Gancelin Jean 1337–1346
 Gilbert Jean 1347–1354
 Arnaud Aubert 1354–1357
 Geoffroi de Vayrols 1358–1361
 Étienne Aubert 6 March 1361 – 17 September 1361 (never consecrated)
 Jean Fabri 1362–1370
 Hugues de La Jugie  27 June – 13 July 1371 (never installed)
 Pierre de Saint-Martial 1372–1391
 Simon de Cramaud, Patriarch of Alexandria (1391–1409) 1391–1409
 Pierre Aimeri 1409–1412
 Géraud du Puy 1413–1420
 Geoffroi de Pompadour 1420–1445
 Jean d’Étampes 1446–1455
 Geoffroi de Basilhac 1456–1459
 Jean du Chastel 1459–1475
 Guichard d'Aubusson 1476–1497

1500 to 1800

 Pierre d'Auxillon 1497–1512
 Hugues de Voisins 1512–1516
 Jean de Basilhac 1516–1521
 Martín de Saint-André 1521–1545
 Charles de Vendôme de Bourbon 1546–1552 and 1565–1567, Cardinal
 François de Faucon 1556–1565
 Vitelli Vitelloti 1567–1568
 Annibal de Ruccellai 1569–1601
 Christophe de L’Estang 1603–1621
 Vitalis de L'Estang 1621–1652
 François de Servien 1653–1654
 Louis de Nogaret de La Valette 1655–1679
 Louis d'Anglure de Bourlemont 1680
 Louis Joseph de Grignan 1681–1722
 Louis Joseph de Chateauneuf de Rochebonne 1722–1729
 Armand Bazin de Bezons 1730–1778
 Jean Auguste de Chastenet de Puységur 1778–1788
 François Marie Fortuné de Vintimille 1789–1791
 Guillaume Bésaucèle 1791–1801, constitutional bishop

From 1800

 Louis Belmas 1801  (Constitutional Bishop)
 Arnaud-Ferdinand de La Porte 1802–1824
 Joseph-Julien de Saint-Rome Gualy 1824–1847
 Henri-Marie-Gaston de Bonnechose 1848–1855
 François-Alexandre Roullet de La Bouillerie 1855–1873
 François-Albert Leuillieux 1873–1881, translated to Chambéry (1881)
 Paul-Félix Arsène Billard 1881–1901
 Paul-Félix Beuvain de Beauséjour 1902–1930
 Emmanuel Coste 1930–1931, then Bishop of Aix
 Jean-Joseph Pays 1932–1951
 Pierre-Marie Joseph Puech 1952–1982
 Jacques Despierre 1982–2004
 Alain Planet 2004–present

See also 
Catholic Church in France
List of Catholic dioceses in France

References

Bibliography

Reference works
 pp. 528–529. (Use with caution; obsolete)
  (in Latin) pp. 166.
 (in Latin) p. 118.
 p. 152.
 pp. 134.
 pp. 143.
 p. 147-148.

Studies

 [Archbishops of Narbonne].

 second edition (in French)

Collections
 [papers given at a congress]

 [Bishops of Carcassonne: pp. 390–535]

External links 
  Centre national des Archives de l'Église de France, L’Épiscopat francais depuis 1919, retrieved: 2016-12-24.
 Goyau, Georges (1908). Carcassonne (Carcassum).  The Catholic Encyclopedia. New York: Robert Appleton Company. Retrieved: 2016-07-28. (obsolete)

Carcassonne
Dioceses established in the 6th century
Carcassonne
6th-century establishments in Francia